Olavi Laurila (born 29 December 1940) is a Finnish archer. He competed in the men's individual event at the 1972 Summer Olympics.

References

1940 births
Living people
Finnish male archers
Olympic archers of Finland
Archers at the 1972 Summer Olympics
Sportspeople from Vaasa